Shift is the name of a proposed bus rapid transit (BRT) network in London, Ontario, consisting of two BRT corridors that meet at a central hub in downtown London. 

Construction was initially anticipated to begin in 2019, but after significant delays, construction started on the first BRT project, the Downtown Loop, in spring 2021 and will continue in phases until 2023. The project received C$170 million in funding from the Ontario government on January 15, 2018.

History
The City of London updated its Transportation Master Plan in May 2013, providing a strategy for transportation and land use decisions to 2030 and beyond. One of its targets was to increase transportation mode share in the city from 12.5% to 20% by 2030, and a key objective to achieve that was to implement a BRT network. The proposed network consisted of an east-west corridor and a north-south corridor, both of which met in the downtown core. The city then initiated planning for a rapid transit project in September 2014, and branded it as "Shift" in January 2015. By November 2015, the envisioned network had changed the corridors to north-east and west-south.

Network

One route will serve the north and east areas of the city, while the other will serve the west and south areas, both which meet at a central transit hub at Wellington and King streets in the downtown.

The North-East Route's termini will be Fanshawe Park Road at Richmond Street, and Second Street at Oxford Street East. The route will be mostly aligned with Richmond Street, King and Dundas Streets, Highbury Avenue and Oxford Street East.

The West-South Route's termini will be Fanshawe Park Road at Wellington Road south of Bradley Avenue, and Wonderland Road and Oxford Street West. The route will be mostly aligned with Wellington Street, Queens Avenue, and Oxford Street West.

References

Public transport in London, Ontario
Proposed public transport in Canada